The 2014 NCAA Division I baseball season, play of college baseball in the United States organized by the National Collegiate Athletic Association (NCAA) at the Division I level, began on February 14, 2014.  The season progressed through the regular season, many conference tournaments and championship series, and concluded with the 2014 NCAA Division I baseball tournament and 2014 College World Series.  The College World Series, consisting of the eight remaining teams in the NCAA tournament and held annually in Omaha, Nebraska, at TD Ameritrade Park Omaha, ended on June 25, 2014 with the final game of the best-of-three championship series between Vanderbilt and Virginia, won by Vanderbilt.

Realignment

There were many significant conference changes that took effect prior to the season.
 Notre Dame and Pittsburgh departed the original Big East for the ACC, joining the Atlantic and Coastal Divisions respectively, and making that a 14-team conference for baseball (the other 2013 arrival in the ACC, Syracuse, does not sponsor baseball).
 The Big East split into two leagues:
The legal successor, composed of Cincinnati, Connecticut, Louisville, Rutgers, and South Florida, along with Conference USA departures Houston, Memphis, Temple, and UCF, formed the American. 
Georgetown, Seton Hall, St. John's, and Villanova joined with Butler and Xavier from the Atlantic 10 and Creighton of the MVC to reform the Big East.
The Great West Conference ceased operations after all but two baseball members secured a place in other conferences. Full member NJIT and baseball affiliate NYIT became Division I Independents.
George Mason moved from the CAA to the Atlantic 10.
College of Charleston moved from the Southern Conference to the CAA.
Conference USA replaced its departing members with Florida Atlantic, FIU, Middle Tennessee, and North Texas of the Sun Belt, Louisiana Tech and UTSA of the WAC, Old Dominion from the CAA and Charlotte from the Atlantic 10.
Oakland moved from The Summit League to the Horizon League.
The MAAC added Quinnipiac and Monmouth, both formerly of the NEC.
San Jose State moved from the WAC to the Mountain West.
Dallas Baptist shifted its baseball-only membership in the WAC to the MVC.
New Orleans joined the Southland after previously playing as an Independent.  Houston Baptist departed the Great West to join the Southland.
The Sun Belt added former WAC members Texas State and Texas–Arlington, plus Georgia State from the CAA.
Former Great West full members Utah Valley, Chicago State, Texas–Pan American, as well as associate members North Dakota and Northern Colorado, joined the WAC.
 Pacific rejoined the West Coast Conference, a league in which it was a charter member.  The Tigers departed the Big West Conference, now a nine-team league.

This was also the final season for several teams in their then-current leagues:
 Maryland would leave the ACC for the Big Ten.
 Louisville and Rutgers would spend only the 2014 season in The American; they respectively left for the ACC and Big Ten.
 A third team from The American, Temple, announced that it would drop the sport after the season.
 East Carolina and Tulane would leave C-USA for The American.
 Western Kentucky would leave the Sun Belt for C-USA
 Appalachian State, Davidson, Georgia Southern, and Elon would all leave the Southern Conference (SoCon). Appalachian State and Georgia Southern joined the Sun Belt, Davidson the Atlantic 10, and Elon the CAA.
 East Tennessee State and Mercer would leave the Atlantic Sun for the SoCon. ETSU returned to the SoCon after a nine-year absence.
 VMI would leave the Big South and return to the SoCon after an 11-year absence.
 Oral Roberts would return to The Summit League after two seasons in the Southland.

Reclassifications from Division II
UMass Lowell joined the America East.
Abilene Christian and Incarnate Word joined the Southland.
Grand Canyon joined the WAC.

Eligibility investigations
The Philadelphia Phillies selected college juniors Ben Wetzler of Oregon State University in the fifth round and Jason Monda of the University of Washington in the sixth round of the 2013 Major League Baseball Draft. Both entered into negotiations with the Phillies with the help of a financial adviser, which is against National Collegiate Athletic Association rules, but is "something that reportedly happens all the time". Both also chose to return to college for their senior year. The Phillies reported Wetzler and Monda to the NCAA, which cleared Monda and suspended Wetzler for the first 11 games, which is 20%, of the college season.

Season outlook

Conference standings

Conference winners and tournaments
Twenty-nine athletic conferences each end their regular seasons with a single-elimination tournament or a double-elimination tournament. The teams in each conference that win their regular season title are given the number one seed in each tournament. The winners of these tournaments receive automatic invitations to the 2014 NCAA Division I baseball tournament.

College World Series

The 2014 season marked the sixty eighth NCAA Baseball Tournament, which culminated with the eight team College World Series.  The College World Series was held in Omaha, Nebraska.  The eight teams played a double-elimination format, with Commodores claiming their first championship with a two games to one series win over Virginia in the final.

Bracket

Award winners

Consensus All-American teams

Major player of the year awards
Dick Howser Trophy: A. J. Reed, Kentucky
Baseball America: A. J. Reed, Kentucky
Collegiate Baseball/Louisville Slugger: A. J. Reed, Kentucky
American Baseball Coaches Association: A. J. Reed, Kentucky
Golden Spikes Award: A. J. Reed, Kentucky

Major freshman of the year awards
Baseball America Freshman Of The Year: Zach Collins, Miami
Collegiate Baseball Freshman Player of the Year: Jake Noll, Florida Gulf Coast
Collegiate Baseball Freshman Pitcher of the Year: Zach Plesac, Ball State

Major coach of the year awards
American Baseball Coaches Association: Tim Corbin, Vanderbilt
Baseball America: Tim Corbin, Vanderbilt
Collegiate Baseball Coach of the Year: Tim Corbin, Vanderbilt
National Collegiate Baseball Writers Association (NCBWA) National Coach of the Year: Mike Gillespie, UC Irvine
ABCA/Baseball America Assistant Coach of the Year: Butch Thompson, Mississippi State

Other major awards
Senior CLASS Award (baseball) (outstanding Senior of the Year in baseball): Andrew Morales, UC Irvine
Johnny Bench Award (Catcher of the Year): Max Pentecost, Kennesaw State
Brooks Wallace Award (Shortstop of the Year): Trea Turner, NC State
John Olerud Award (best two-way player): A. J. Reed, Kentucky
American Baseball Coaches Association Gold Glove:

Coaching changes
This table lists programs that changed head coaches at any point from the first day of the 2014 season until the day before the first day of the 2015 season.

See also

2014 NCAA Division I baseball rankings
2014 NCAA Division I baseball tournament

References